This is a list of people from Cranbrook, Kent, England.

Born in Cranbrook
William Addison VC (1883–1962), Army chaplain.
John Boorman (c.1754–1807), cricketer
Douglas Carr (1872–1950), cricketer.
Jon Cleary (born 1962), musician.
Nathaniel Courthope (1585–c.1620), merchant mariner.
Phineas Fletcher (1582–1620), poet.
William Huntington (1745–1813), preacher.
Douglas Jerrold (1803–57), dramatist.
John Neve (1902–76), cricketer.
William Neve (1852–1942), architect.
Arthur Tooth (1839–1931), priest.
Peter West (1902–2003), sports commentator.†

Old Cranbrookians
These people attended Cranbrook School.
John Akehurst (1930–2007), soldier.
Antony Atkinson (born 19??), economist.
John Barraclough (1918–2008), RAF officer.
Emma Biggs (born 1956), artist
Hugo Burnham (born 1956), musician
John Collins (1905–82), clergyman
Barry Davies (born c.1937), sports commentator.
Phil Edmonds (born 1951), cricketer.
Harry Hill (born 1964), comedian and television presenter.
Victor Horsley (1857–1916), scientist.
Norman Hulbert (1903–72), RAF officer and MP.
Arthur Surridge Hunt (1871–1934), papyrologist.
Richard Hunter (born 1953), classical scholar.
Hammond Innes (1913–98), novelist.
Kevin Lygo (born 19??), television executive.
Richard Middleton (1882–1911), poet.
Brian Moore (born 1932), sports commentator.
Richard Pilbrow (born 1933), producer.
Piers Sellers (born 1955), astronaut.
Tim Smit (born 1954), businessman.
Charles Wheeler (1923–2008), journalist and presenter.
Wallace Wright VC (1875–1953), soldier and MP.

People connected with Cranbrook
These people have a connection with Cranbrook
Robert Abbot (1558?–1662?), theologian, was vicar of Cranbrook 1616–43
Dudley Fenner (c 1558–87), puritan.
Frederick Hardy (1827–1911), artist, was a member of the Cranbrook Colony of artists.
Chris Langham, (born 1949), writer, actor and comedian, lives in Cranbrook.
Douglas Lowe (1902–81) Olympic athlete and JP was residing in Cranbrook at the time of his death.

Notes
† Also Old Cranbrookian.

 
Cranbrook
People from Cranbrook